Philip Powell (sometimes spelled Philip Powel) (2 February 1594 – 30 June 1646) was a lawyer who became a Benedictine monk and priest, serving as a missionary in England during the period of recusancy. He was martyred at Tyburn.

Early life
Powell is usually said to have been born in Trallong, Brecknockshire, Wales. From his youth he was a student of law, taught principally by David Baker, (who would later become a Benedictine himself, taking the name Augustine Baker). At the age of sixteen he went to study at one of the Inns of Court, London, and afterwards practiced civil law.

Priesthood
Three or four years later he received the Benedictine habit, becoming part of the community of St. Gregory at Douai (now at Downside Abbey, near Bath). In 1618 he was ordained priest and in 1622 left Douai to go on mission in England. In around 1624 he became chaplain to the Poyntz family at Leighland, Somerset.

When the English Civil War broke out he retired to Yarnscombe and Parkham in Devon. He then served for six months as chaplain to the Catholic soldiers in General Goring's army in Cornwall, and, when that force was disbanded, took ship for South Wales. The vessel was captured on 22 February 1646, and Powell was recognised and denounced as a priest.

Imprisonment and martyrdom
On 11 May he was sent to London and confined in St. Catherine's Gaol, Southwark, where his treatment brought on a severe attack of pleurisy. His trial, which had been fixed for 30 May, did not take place until 9 June, at Westminster Hall. He was found guilty of being a priest and was hanged, drawn, and quartered at Tyburn. It is recorded that when informed of his death sentence, Powell exclaimed "Oh what am I that God thus honours me and will have me to die for his sake?" and called for a glass of sack.

He was beatified by Pope Pius XI in 1929.

References

1594 births
1646 deaths
Welsh Benedictines
17th-century Welsh Roman Catholic priests
People from Brecknockshire
People executed by Stuart England by hanging, drawing and quartering
Martyred Roman Catholic priests
English beatified people
17th-century Roman Catholic martyrs
17th-century venerated Christians
Welsh military chaplains
English Civil War chaplains
Executed Welsh people
People executed at Tyburn
One Hundred and Seven Martyrs of England and Wales